The infrapatellar branch of saphenous nerve is a nerve of the lower limb.

The saphenous nerve, located about the middle of the thigh, gives off a branch which joins the subsartorial plexus.

It pierces the sartorius and fascia lata, and is distributed to the skin in front of the patella.

This nerve communicates above the knee with the anterior cutaneous branches of the femoral nerve; below the knee, with other branches of the saphenous; and, on the lateral side of the joint, with branches of the lateral femoral cutaneous nerve, forming a plexiform net-work, the plexus patellae.

The infrapatellar branch is occasionally small, and ends by joining the anterior cutaneous branches of the femoral, which supply its place in front of the knee.

References

}

Nerves of the lower limb and lower torso